

Championships

2000 Olympics
Men:
 
 
 
Women:

Professional
Men
2000 NBA Finals:  Los Angeles Lakers over the Indiana Pacers 4-2.  MVP:  Shaquille O'Neal
1999–2000 NBA season, 2000 NBA Playoffs, 2000 NBA draft, 2000 NBA All-Star Game
Women
WNBA Finals: Houston Comets over the New York Liberty 2-0.  MVP:  Cynthia Cooper
2000 WNBA season, 2000 WNBA Playoffs, 2000 WNBA draft, 2000 WNBA All-Star Game

College
Men
NCAA Division I:  Michigan State University 89, University of Florida 76
National Invitation Tournament:  Wake Forest University 71, University of Notre Dame 61
NCAA Division II: Metropolitan State College of Denver 97, Kentucky Wesleyan College 79
NCAA Division III: Catholic 76, William Paterson College 62
NAIA Division I:  Life University (Ga.) 61, Georgetown College (Ky.) 59
NAIA Division II: Embry–Riddle Aeronautical University (Florida) 75, University of the Ozarks (Mo.) 63
NJCAA Division I:   Southeastern C.C., W. Burlington, Iowa 84,  Calhoun C.C., Decatur, Alabama 70
Women
NCAA Division I:  University of Connecticut 71, University of Tennessee 52
NCAA Division II: Northern Kentucky 71, North Dakota State University 62 (OT)
NCAA Division III Washington (Mo.) 77, University of Southern Maine 33
NAIA Division I: Oklahoma City University 64, Simon Fraser (BC) 55
NAIA Division II University of Mary (N.D.) 59, Northwestern (Iowa) 49

Awards and honors

Professional
Men
NBA Most Valuable Player Award:   Shaquille O'Neal
NBA Rookie of the Year Award:  (tie) Elton Brand & Steve Francis
NBA Defensive Player of the Year Award:  Alonzo Mourning
NBA Coach of the Year Award: Doc Rivers, Orlando Magic
Euroscar Award: Gregor Fučka, Fortitudo Bologna and 
Mr. Europa: Gregor Fučka, Fortitudo Bologna and Italy
Women
WNBA Most Valuable Player Award: Sheryl Swoopes, Houston Comets
WNBA Defensive Player of the Year Award: Sheryl Swoopes, Houston Comets
WNBA Rookie of the Year Award: Betty Lennox, Minnesota Lynx
WNBA Most Improved Player Award: Tari Phillips, New York Liberty
Kim Perrot Sportsmanship Award: Suzie McConnell Serio, Cleveland Rockers
WNBA Coach of the Year Award: Michael Cooper, Los Angeles Sparks
WNBA All-Star Game MVP: Tina Thompson, Houston Comets
WNBA Finals Most Valuable Player Award: Cynthia Cooper, Houston Comets

Collegiate 
 Combined
Legends of Coaching Award: Mike Krzyzewski, Duke
 Men
John R. Wooden Award: Kenyon Martin, Cincinnati
Naismith College Coach of the Year: Mike Montgomery, Stanford
Frances Pomeroy Naismith Award: Scoonie Penn, Ohio State
Associated Press College Basketball Player of the Year: Kenyon Martin, Cincinnati
NCAA basketball tournament Most Outstanding Player: Shane Battier, Duke
USBWA National Freshman of the Year: Jason Gardner, Arizona
Associated Press College Basketball Coach of the Year: Larry Eustachy, Iowa State
Naismith Outstanding Contribution to Basketball: Bill Wall
 Women
Naismith College Player of the Year: Tamika Catchings, Tennessee
Naismith College Coach of the Year: Geno Auriemma, Connecticut
Wade Trophy: Edwina Brown, Texas
Frances Pomeroy Naismith Award: Helen Darling, Penn State
Associated Press Women's College Basketball Player of the Year: Tamika Catchings, Tennessee
NCAA basketball tournament Most Outstanding Player: Shea Ralph, UConn
Carol Eckman Award: Kathy Delaney-Smith, Harvard University
Associated Press College Basketball Coach of the Year: Geno Auriemma, Connecticut
Nancy Lieberman Award: Sue Bird, Connecticut
Naismith Outstanding Contribution to Basketball: Harley Redin

Naismith Memorial Basketball Hall of Fame
Class of 2000:
 Daniel "Danny" Biasone
 Robert A. McAdoo
 Charles Martin Newton
 Pat Head Summitt
 Isiah L. Thomas
 Morgan B. Wootten

Women's Basketball Hall of Fame
Class of 2000

 Alline Banks Sprouse
 Mildred Barnes
 Barbara "Breezy" Bishop
 E. Wayne Cooley
 Nancy Dunkle
 Olga Sukharnova
 Borislav Stankovic
 Fran Garmon

 Dorothy Gaters
 Sue Gunter
 Rita Horky
 Betty Jaynes
 George E. Killian
 Kim Mulkey-Robertson
 Cindy Noble Hauserman
 Lorene Ramsey

 Patricia (Trish) Roberts
 Sue Rojcewicz
 Cathy Rush
 Juliene Brazinski Simpson
 Katherine Washington
 Dean Weese
 Marcy Weston
 Kay Yow

Events
 The Gary Steelheads joins the CBA
 January: Mark Cuban becomes owner of the Dallas Mavericks 
 November 17: For the Phoenix Suns against the New York Knicks, Jason Kidd is debited with an NBA-record 14 turnovers in one game

Movies
Finding Forrester
Love & Basketball
Whatever Happened to Micheal Ray?

Deaths
 January 4 — Al Schrecker, American NBL player (Pittsburgh Raiders) (born 1917)
 January 12 — Bobby Phills, Cleveland Cavaliers and Charlotte Hornets guard (born 1969)
 January 16 — Örlygur Aron Sturluson, Icelandic basketball player (Njarðvík) (born 1981)
 February 21 — Antonio Díaz-Miguel, Hall of Fame Spanish coach (born 1933)
 February 24 — Bernard Opper, All-American college player (Kentucky), NBL and original ABL player (born 1915)
 March 7 — Darrell Floyd, American college basketball player and national scoring champion (Furman)
 March 8 — Joe Mullaney, American college coach (Providence College) (born 1925)
 March 12 — Aleksandar Nikolić, Hall of Fame Serbian coach (born 1924)
 April 6 — Stan Watts, Hall of Fame college coach at Brigham Young University (born 1911)
 April 9 — Jack Gardner, Hall of Fame college coach at Kansas State and Utah (born 1910)
 May 5 — Bill Musselman, ABA, NBA and college coach.  The first head coach of the Minnesota Timberwolves franchise (born 1940)
 May 9 — John Nucatola, Hall of Fame college and professional referee (born 1907)
 May 20 — Malik Sealy, Minnesota Timberwolves guard (born 1970)
 June 9 — John "Brooms" Abramovic, First college player to score 2000+ points and early professional (born 1919)
 June 16 — Mike Silliman, American NBA player (Buffalo Braves) and Olympic gold medalist (1968) (born 1944)
 June 28 — Haskell Cohen, former NBA public relations director and creator of Parade High School All-America teams (born 1914)
 July 7 — Denny Price, 62, American AAU player (Phillips 66ers) and college coach (Sam Houston State, Phillips).
 July 10 — Conrad McRae,  Syracuse forward who played in Europe (born 1971)
 August 25 — Leo Barnhorst, Two-time NBA All-Star with the Indianapolis Olympians (born 1924)
 September 13 — Duane Swanson, American Olympic gold medalist (1936) (born 1913)
 October 6 — John Keller, American Olympic gold medalist (1952) (born 1928)
 October 7 — Ed Beisser, American college All-American (Creighton) and AAU  (Phillips 66ers) player (born 1919)
 December 15 — Haris Brkić, Serbian player (Partizan) (born 1974)
 December 31 — Wayne Glasgow, American Olympic gold medalist (1952) (born 1926)

References

External links